The Gabai River, a minor river in the Langat River basin, flows from the  Big Ghost Mountain in the state of Negeri Sembilan, Malaysia into the Dipterocarp forest reserve of the Hulu Langat district in the adjacent state of Selangor.

Gabai Falls

In Hulu Langat, the river descends in a set of waterfalls known as the Gabai Falls, a popular attraction for the locals, but relatively unknown with tourists. A cemented path leads from the parking to the lower falls. Along the path several shelters have been built. The upper falls can be reached by trails.

See also
 Geography of Malaysia

References

 

Waterfalls of Malaysia
Landforms of Selangor
Nature sites of Selangor
Rivers of Selangor
Rivers of Malaysia